Idol 2018 is the fourteenth season of Swedish Idol. This season is broadcast on TV4, as were earlier seasons. The hosts and the judges remained the same from the previous season. For the first time in the shows history there was a Top 13. Sebastian Walldén won the final.

Elimination chart 

1 On November 30 will 2 contestants leave the competition

Top 14

Top 13 - Fridayparty

Top 12 - This is me

Top 11 - Divas

Top 10 – Duets 
The Contestant marked in pink was eliminated the contestant marked in lightblue was in the bottom two

Top 9 - Hits on Swedish

Top 8 - Bigband

Top 7 - Parent’s Choice

Top 6 - Celebrity Duets

Top 5 – Swedish music exports and Love

Top 4 – Semifinal: Judges Choice 

In this semifinal will 2 acts leave the competition.

Top 2 – Final: Contestants Choice Viewers Choice Winners Single

Auditions
4 March 2018: Karlstad, Karlstad CCC
10 March 2018: Umeå, Väven
18 March 2018: Göteborg, Eriksbergshallen
24 March 2018: Helsingborg, Helsingborg Arena
14 April 2018: Stockholm, Tele2 Arena

References

Idol (Swedish TV series)
2018 in Swedish music
2018 Swedish television seasons